Masdevallia wendlandiana is a species of orchid native to the tropical South America around Brazil and Peru.

wendlandiana